Mihaela Ciobanu (born 30 January 1973 in Bucharest) is a retired Romanian-born Spanish handball goalkeeper, who played on the Spanish women's national team.

She was part of the Spanish team at the 2008 European Women's Handball Championship, where the Spanish team reached the final, after defeating Germany in the semifinal.

She competed at the 2011 World Women's Handball Championship in Brazil, where the Spanish team placed third.

She took also part at the 2012 Summer Olympics, where Spanish team won the bronze medal, after defeating South Korea. In that game Ciobanu saved four seven-meter penalty shots.

On October 1, 2018, she signed a 2-year contract with CSM București for the position of goalkeeping coach.

References

External links

1973 births
Living people
Sportspeople from Bucharest
Romanian female handball players
Spanish female handball players
Spanish people of Romanian descent
Romanian expatriate sportspeople in Spain
Romanian emigrants to Spain
Olympic medalists in handball
Olympic handball players of Spain
Handball players at the 2012 Summer Olympics
Olympic bronze medalists for Spain
Medalists at the 2012 Summer Olympics
Competitors at the 2009 Mediterranean Games
Naturalised citizens of Spain
Mediterranean Games competitors for Spain